Staicele parish is an administrative unit of Limbaži Municipality, Latvia. It was created in 2010 from the countryside territory of Staicele town. At the beginning of 2014, the population of the parish was 621.

Towns, villages and settlements of Staicele parish 
 Karogi
 Mārciemi
 Puršēni
 Rozēni
 Vīķi

References

External links 
 

Parishes of Latvia
Limbaži Municipality
Vidzeme